The County of Derby is one of the 49 counties of South Australia. It was proclaimed 1877 by Governor Anthony Musgrave. It covers a rectangular portion of unincorporated pastoral land in the state's Far North. As of 2014, the county has not been divided into hundreds.

See also
Lands administrative divisions of South Australia

References

Derby
Far North (South Australia)
D